This is a list of fighter aces in World War II from Denmark.

See also
List of World War II aces by country

References

Denmark
Danish military personnel
Danish military-related lists
Lists of Danish people by occupation